Star Wars: Thrawn Ascendancy: Chaos Rising is a Star Wars novel by Timothy Zahn, published on April 27, 2020, by Del Rey Books.

Reception
Both James Whitebrook of Gizmodo and Sean Keane of CNet gave overall positive reviews for the book.

See also
 List of Star Wars books, the list of novels published in the Star Wars series

References

Thrawn
Novels based on Star Wars
2020 American novels
2020 science fiction novels
Del Rey books
Novels by Timothy Zahn